The 2019–20 F.C. Crotone season was the club's 111th season in existence and the second consecutive season in the second division of Italian football. In addition to the domestic league, Crotone participated in this season's edition of the Coppa Italia. The season covered the period from 1 July 2019 to 31 July 2020.

Players

First-team squad
.

Out on loan

Pre-season and friendlies

Competitions

Overview

Serie B

League table

Results summary

Results by round

Matches

Coppa Italia

Statistics

Goalscorers

References

External links

F.C. Crotone seasons
Crotone